Colorado City Municipal Airport  is a general aviation airport located  southwest of the central business district of Colorado City, in Mohave County, Arizona, United States. The airport is not served by any commercial airlines. There are both JET-A and 100LL fuel services at this airport.

Although most U.S. airports use the same three-letter location identifier for the FAA and IATA, Colorado City Municipal Airport is assigned AZC by the FAA but has no designation from the IATA.

Facilities 
 Runway 11/29: 6,300 x 75 ft (1,920 x 23 m), surface: asphalt
 Runway 2/20: 5,099 x 60 ft (1,554 x 18 m), surface: asphalt

References

External links 
 Colorado City Municipal Airport (AZC) at Arizona DOT airport directory
 

Airports in Mohave County, Arizona